Pasquale Grassi (1584–1636) was a Roman Catholic prelate who served as Bishop of Chioggia (1619–1636).

Biography
Pasquale Grassi was born in Chioggia, Italy on 5 April 1584.
On 29 April 1619, he was appointed during the papacy of Pope Paul V as Bishop of Chioggia.
On 2 June 1619, he was consecrated bishop by Ulpiano Volpi, Archbishop Emeritus of Chieti, with Galeazzo Sanvitale, Archbishop Emeritus of Bari-Canosa, and Attilio Amalteo, Titular Archbishop of Athenae, serving as co-consecrators. 
He served as Bishop of Chioggia until his death on 12 December 1636.

Episcopal succession

References

External links and additional sources
 (for Chronology of Bishops) 
 (for Chronology of Bishops) 

17th-century Italian Roman Catholic bishops
Bishops appointed by Pope Paul V
1584 births
1636 deaths